Ernst Willem Veenemans (18 March 1940 – 2 October 2017) was a Dutch rower who had his best achievements in the coxless pairs event, together with Steven Blaisse. Together they won silver medals at the 1964 Summer Olympics, gold medals at the 1964 European Championships and bronze medals at the 1961 European Championships.

References

External links
 

1940 births
2017 deaths
Dutch male rowers
Olympic rowers of the Netherlands
Rowers at the 1960 Summer Olympics
Rowers at the 1964 Summer Olympics
Olympic silver medalists for the Netherlands
Sportspeople from Haarlem
Olympic medalists in rowing
Medalists at the 1964 Summer Olympics
European Rowing Championships medalists